The 2007 Dutch Figure Skating Championships took place between 15 and 17 December 2006 in Utrecht. Skaters competed in the disciplines of men's singles, ladies' singles, and ice dancing.

Senior results

Men

Ladies

Ice dancing

External links
 results

Dutch Figure Skating Championships
2006 in figure skating
Dutch Figure Skating Championships, 2007
2007 in Dutch sport